Ventnor Towers Hotel is a large hotel in Ventnor on the Isle of Wight. It was first built in 1872 and has been extended multiple times since its initial construction. It is notably one of the few hotels on the Isle of Wight to have a functioning Helipad. The hotel is south-facing, and sits little more than a few hundred feet from the steep cliffs that give access to Bonchurch. Documents on display inside the hotel mention of a similar hotel in the neighbouring town of Shanklin having been built around the same time as this hotel, but it has long since been defunct.

Alternate names
For a short time between the mid-1990s and the mid-2000s, the hotel was managed by Best Western, and was known as Best Western Ventnor. After the owners chose to manage the hotel instead, the hotel's name reverted to its current name.

References

Isle of Wight
Hotels on the Isle of Wight
Ventnor